This is a list of psychotropic medications that are on the market in the United States.

A

Abilify (aripiprazole) – atypical antipsychotic used to treat schizophrenia, bipolar disorder, and irritability associated with autism.
Adderall (mixed amphetamine salts) – a stimulant used to treat ADHD.
Ambien (zolpidem) – used as a sleep aid.
Anafranil (clomipramine) – a tricyclic antidepressant; mostly used to treat OCD.
Aricept (donepezil) – used to slow the progression of Alzheimer's disease.
Ativan (lorazepam) – a benzodiazepine, used to treat anxiety.
Asendin (amoxapine) - an Dibenzoxazepine antidepressant 
Azstarys (Serdexmethylphenidate/Dexmethylphenidate) - a long-acting stimulant used to treat ADHD.

B
Benperidol – an antipsychotic primarily used to control antisocial hypersexual behaviour.
Buspar (buspirone) – an anxiolytic used to treat generalized anxiety disorder.
Belsomra (Suvorexant) – used to treat insomnia.

C

Celexa (citalopram) – an antidepressant of the selective serotonin reuptake inhibitor class.
Centrax (prazepam) - an antianxiety agent
clobazam (Frisium, Onfi, Tapclob, Urbanol) – a benzodiazepine that has been marketed as an anxiolytic since 1975 and as an anticonvulsant since 1984.
clorazepate (Novo-Clopate, Tranxene) – a benzodiazepine with anxiolytic, anticonvulsant, sedative, hypnotic, and skeletal muscle relaxant properties.
chlordiazepoxide (Librium) – a sedative and hypnotic benzodiazepine used to treat anxiety, insomnia, and withdrawal symptoms.
Clozaril (clozapine) – atypical antipsychotic used to treat resistant schizophrenia.
Concerta (methylphenidate) – an extended release form of methylphenidate.
Contrave (naltrexone/bupropion) – a combination drug used in the treatment of mood and psychotic disorders. It is also approved for weight loss in those that are either obese or overweight with some weight-related illnesses.
Cymbalta (duloxetine) – an antidepressant of the serotonin-norepinephrine reuptake inhibitors class.

D
 Depakote (valproic acid/sodium valproate) – an antiepileptic and mood stabilizer used to treat bipolar disorder, neuropathic pain and others; sometimes called an antimanic medication. Depakene is the trade name for the same drug prepared without sodium.
Desyrel (trazodone) – an atypical antidepressant used to treat depression and insomnia.
Desoxyn (methamphetamine hydrochloride) – used to treat attention deficit hyperactivity disorder and exogenous obesity.
Dexedrine (dextroamphetamine sulfate) – used to treat attention deficit hyperactivity disorder and narcolepsy.
disulfiram (Antabuse) – inhibits enzyme acetaldehyde dehydrogenase, causing acetaldehyde poisoning when ethanol is consumed; used to cause severe hangover when drinking; increases liver, kidney, and brain damage from drinking.
doxepin (Aponal, Quitaxon, Sinequan) – a tricyclic antidepressant used to treat nerve pain, insomnia; similar to imipramine.

E

Effexor and Effexor XR (venlafaxine) – an antidepressant of the SNRI class.
Elavil (amitriptyline) – a tricyclic antidepressant used as a first-line treatment for neuropathic pain.
estazolam (Prosom, Eurodin) – a benzodiazepine derivative with anxiolytic, anticonvulsant, hypnotic, sedative and skeletal muscle relaxant properties, commonly prescribed for short-term treatment of insomnia.

F
Fetzima (levomilnacipran) – an antidepressant of the SNRI class.
Fycompa (perampanel), an anti-epileptic medication which can cause serious psychiatric and behavioral changes.

G

Geodon (ziprasidone) – atypical antipsychotic used to treat schizophrenia and bipolar mania.
Gabitril (tiagabine) – used off-label in the treatment of anxiety disorders and panic disorder.

H

Haldol (haloperidol) – typical antipsychotic.

I

Imovane (zopiclone) – a non-benzodiazepine hypnotic.
Inderal (propranolol) – a beta blocker; it is used for acute anxiety, panic attacks, hypertension.
Invega (paliperidone) – atypical antipsychotic used to treat schizophrenia and schizoaffective disorder.

K

Keppra (levetiracetam) – an anticonvulsant drug which is sometimes used as a mood stabilizer and has potential benefits for other psychiatric and neurologic conditions such as Tourette syndrome, anxiety disorder, and Alzheimer's disease.
Klonopin (clonazepam) – anti-anxiety and anti-epileptic medication of the benzodiazepine class.

L

Lamictal (lamotrigine) – an anticonvulsant used as a mood stabilizer.
Latuda (lurasidone) – an atypical antipsychotic.
Lexapro (escitalopram) – an antidepressant of the SSRI class.
Librium (chlordiazepoxide) – a benzodiazepine used to treat acute alcohol withdrawal.
Lithium (Lithobid, Eskalith) – a mood stabilizer.
Loxam (escitalopram) – an antidepressant of the SSRI class.
Lunesta (eszopiclone) – a non-benzodiazepine hypnotic.
Luvox (fluvoxamine) – an antidepressant of the SSRI class.
Loxitane (loxapine) - an antipsychotic used in the treatment of mood disorders and schizophrenia

M

Melatonin – a hypnotic used to treat insomnia.
Minipress (Prazosin) - atypical psychotropic used to treat PTSD.

N

Naltrexone (ReVia) – an opioid antagonist primarily used in the management of alcohol dependence, opioid dependence or other impulse control/addictive behaviors such as habitual self-mutilation; also used in formulation with bupropion (naltrexone/bupropion) to treat obesity.
Neurontin (gabapentin) – an anticonvulsant which is sometimes used as a mood stabilizer, anti-anxiety agent or to treat chronic pain, particularly diabetic neuropathy.
Norapramin (Desipramine) - an antidepressant, also used in the treatment of nerve pain.
Nuplazid (pimavanserin) - an antipsychotic medicine that works by changing the actions of chemicals in the brain; used to treat hallucinations and delusions caused by psychosis that is related to Parkinson's disease.

P

 Pamelor – a tricyclic antidepressant.
 Parnate (tranylcypromine) - a monoamine oxidase inhibitors (MAOI) used in the treatment of depression
Paxil (paroxetine) – an antidepressant of the SSRI class.
Phenelzine (Nardil) – an antidepressant of the MAOI class used to depression.
Pimozide (Orap) – a typical antipsychotic used to treat tic disorders.
Pristiq (desvenlafaxine) – an antidepressant of the SNRI class.
Prolixin (fluphenazine) – typical antipsychotic.
Provigil (modafinil) - used to treat excessive sleepiness and narcolepsy
Prozac (fluoxetine) – an antidepressant of the SSRI class.
Phenobarbital (Luminal) – a barbiturate with sedative and hypnotic properties.

R

Remeron (mirtazapine) – an atypical antidepressant which is often used as a sleep aid.
Restoril (temazepam) – a benzodiazepine used to treat insomnia.
Risperdal (risperidone) – atypical antipsychotic used to treat schizophrenia, bipolar disorder and irritability associated with autism.
Ritalin (methylphenidate) – a stimulant used to treat ADHD.
Reminyl (galantamine) – used to slow the progression of Alzheimer's dementia.
ReVia (naltrexone) – used for opioid addiction and dependence.
Rexulti (brexpiprazole) – atypical antipsychotic used to treat mood and psychotic disorders.

S

Saphris (asenapine) – atypical antipsychotic used to treat schizophrenia and bipolar disorder.
Serax (oxazepam) – anti-anxiety medication of the benzodiazepine class, often used to help during detoxification from alcohol or other addictive substances.
Serentil (mesoridazine) a neuroleptic drug used in the treatment of schizophrenia.
Seroquel and Seroquel XR (quetiapine) – atypical antipsychotic used to treat schizophrenia and bipolar disorder. used off-label (in low doses) to treat insomnia.
Sonata (zaleplon) – a non-benzodiazepine hypnotic.
Spravato (esketamine) – a rapid-acting antidepressant of the NMDA receptor antagonist class; enantiomer of ketamine.
Stelazine (trifluoperazine) – an antipsychotic used in the treatment of psychotics disorders, anxiety, and nausea caused by chemotherapy.
Strattera (atomoxetine) – a non-stimulant medication used to treat ADHD.

T
Tenex (Guanfacine) - a nonstimulant medication used in the treatment of Attention Deficit Hyperactivity Disorder (ADHD) 
Thorazine – (chlorpromazine) the first antipsychotic 
Tofranil (imipramine) – a tricyclic antidepressant used to treat depression, anxiety, agitation, panic disorder and bedwetting.
Topamax (topiramate) – an anticonvulsant used to treat epilepsy and migraine headaches.
Trileptal (oxcarbazepine) – an anticonvulsant used as a mood stabilizer.
Trintellix (vortioxetine) – an antidepressant of the serotonin modulator and stimulator class.
Tegretol (carbamazepine) – an anticonvulsant used as a mood stabilizer.
Trilafon (Perphenazine)- an antipsychotic used to treat schizophrenia.

V

Valium (diazepam) – a benzodiazepine used to treat anxiety.
Vistaril (hydroxyzine) – an antihistamine for the treatment of itches and irritations, an antiemetic, as a weak analgesic, an opioid potentiator, and as an anxiolytic.
Vyvanse (lisdexamfetamine) – a stimulant used to treat attention deficit hyperactivity disorder and binge eating disorder; Vyvanse is converted into Dexedrine in vivo.
Viibryd (vilazodone) – an antidepressant of the serotonin modulator and stimulators class.
Vivactil (Protriptyline) an antidepressant also used in the treatment of nerve pain.
Vraylar (cariprazine) – atypical antipsychotic used to treat schizophrenia and bipolar mania.

W

Wellbutrin SR or XL (bupropion) – an antidepressant of the norepinephrine-dopamine reuptake inhibitor class, used to treat depression and seasonal affective disorder. 
Zyban – the same medication but marketed as a smoking cessation aid.

X

Xanax (alprazolam) – a benzodiazepine used to treat anxiety.

Z

Zoloft (sertraline) – an antidepressant of the SSRI class.
Zulresso (brexanolone) – a GABA Modulator Antidepressants
Zyprexa (olanzapine) – atypical antipsychotic used to treat schizophrenia and bipolar disorder.

References

Anxiety disorders